The Gaburici Cabinet was the Cabinet of Moldova from 18 February to 30 July 2015. It consisted of ministers from the Liberal Democratic Party (PLDM) and the Democratic Party (PDM), who together formed the Political Alliance for a European Moldova. The Cabinet was installed after a successful vote of confidence held in the Parliament of Moldova on 18 February 2015. It was a minority government.

Composition 

The Cabinet consisted of the Prime Minister of Moldova Chiril Gaburici, three Deputy Prime Ministers, 14 other ministers, and two ex officio members.

Ministers

Ex officio members 
The Başkan (Governor) of Gagauzia is elected by universal, equal, direct, secret and free suffrage on an alternative basis for a term of 4 years. One and the same person can be a governor for no more than two consecutive terms. The Başkan of Gagauzia is confirmed as a member of the Moldovan government by a decree of the President of Moldova.

References 

 

Moldova cabinets
Coalition governments
2015 establishments in Moldova
Cabinets established in 2015